Peter Armitage CBE (born 15 June 1924) is a statistician specialising in medical statistics.

Peter Armitage attended Huddersfield College and went on to read mathematics at Trinity College, Cambridge. Armitage belonged to the generation of mathematicians who came to maturity in the Second World War. He joined the weapons procurement agency, the Ministry of Supply where he worked on statistical problems with George Barnard.

After the war he resumed his studies and then worked as a statistician for the Medical Research Council from 1947 to 1961. From 1961 to 1976, he was Professor of Medical Statistics at the London School of Hygiene and Tropical Medicine where he succeeded Austin Bradford Hill. His main work there was on sequential analysis. He moved to Oxford as Professor of Biomathematics and became Professor of Applied Statistics and head of the new Department of Statistics, retiring in 1990. He was president of the Royal Statistical Society in 1982–4. He was president of the International Society for Clinical Biostatistics in 1990–1991. He is editor-in-chief of the Encyclopedia of Biostatistics. He lives in Wallingford, Oxfordshire.

References 
 Basic career information is in the entry in
 Who's Who 2005
 There are recollections in
 Peter Armitage "Purposes, methods, philosophies", Significance Volume 1 Issue 4 Page 170 - December 2004

External links 
 A brief biography at wiley.co.uk (publisher of the Encyclopedia of Biostatics)
 There is a photograph at the 'Peter Armitage on the Portraits of Statisticians' page

Academics of the London School of Hygiene & Tropical Medicine
Alumni of Trinity College, Cambridge
Commanders of the Order of the British Empire
English statisticians
Fellows of St Peter's College, Oxford
Living people
People educated at Huddersfield New College
Presidents of the Royal Statistical Society
1924 births
Biostatisticians